The Big Night is a 1960 American drama film directed by Sidney Salkow and written by Ric Hardman. The film stars Randy Sparks, Venetia Stevenson, Dick Foran, Jesse White, Dick Contino and Frank Ferguson. The film was released on February 17, 1960 by Paramount Pictures.

Plot

Police kill two fleeing criminals while a third escapes. A briefcase tossed from their car's window into a canal is recovered by a young man, Frankie, who discovers that it contains $209,000 in cash from a bank robbery.

Frankie confides in his girlfriend Ellie, whose mother has expressed worry about her dating a young hoodlum. Ellie can't persuade Frankie to do the honest thing and return the money, which he hides. Carl Farrow, the remaining bank robber, begins trying to find out who has it, as does Wegg, a corrupt cop.

Following the boy, Wegg tries to cut himself in on a deal with Farrow, who instead slugs him and leaves him dead in the canal. Frightened after finding the body, Frankie turns himself in to the police. Farrow comes gunning for him but Frankie survives, then hopes for leniency from the law.

Cast
 Randy Sparks as Frank
 Venetia Stevenson as Ellie
 Dick Foran as Ed
 Jesse White as Wegg
Dick Contino as Carl Farrow
 Frank Ferguson as Dave
 Paul Langton as Spencer
 House Peters, Jr. as Robert Shaw
 Robert Paget as Tony 
 Marc Cavell as Jerry
 Kay E. Kuter as The Mailman
 Anna Lee as Mrs. Turner

Reception 
In a brief contemporary review for The New York Times, critic Eugene Archer wrote that the film consists of "Randy Sparks as a juvenile delinquent who finds a briefcase containing $200,000 in stolen banknotes and wastes more than seventy minutes of screen and audience time before turning it over to the police. Venetia Stevenson, Dick Foran and Anna Lee are inconspicuous in the cast."

References

External links 
 

1960 films
1960s English-language films
Paramount Pictures films
American drama films
1960 drama films
Films directed by Sidney Salkow
Films scored by Richard LaSalle
1960s American films